Alma Gwen Squire (née Rix, 1 April 1918 − 30 April 2000) was a New Zealand diver, who represented her country at the 1938 British Empire Games.

Early life and family
Born Alma Gwen Rix, Squire was born in Dunedin, New Zealand, on 1 April 1918, the daughter of Edwin Montague Rix and Ella Mable Rix (née Miller). Her father, a tramway motorman, died in 1925. She was educated at King Edward Technical College, where she was an accomplished netball player. On 26 December 1945, she married Arthur William Squire in Christchurch.

Swimming and diving
Beginning her aquatic career as a swimmer, Rix competed at the 1931 junior amateur swimming championships in the 50 yards and 100 yards freestyle events. The following year, she was second in the breaststroke at the national junior championships. 

Rix began diving in 1934 and benefitted from coaching by Australian Harry Tickle when he toured New Zealand that same year. At the 1935 national championships, Rix was second in the women's diving. She went on to win the New Zealand national diving championship every year from 1936 to 1941, apart from 1937, when the event was not held.

Considered unlucky by some not to have been selected for the 1936 Olympics, Rix competed for New Zealand at the 1938 British Empire Games in Sydney, where she finished sixth in the women's 3 m springboard.

Death
Squire died on 30 April 2000, and her ashes were buried at the Woodlawn Memorial Gardens in Christchurch. Her husband had predeceased her in 1988.

References

1918 births
2000 deaths
Sportspeople from Dunedin
People educated at King Edward Technical College
New Zealand female divers
Commonwealth Games competitors for New Zealand
Divers at the 1938 British Empire Games